The 1973–74 Divizia B was the 34th season of the second tier of the Romanian football league system.

The format has been changed to three series, each of them having 18 teams. At the end of the season the winners of the series promoted to Divizia A and the last four places from each series relegated to Divizia C.

Team changes

To Divizia B
Promoted from Divizia C
 CSM Suceava
 Viitorul Vaslui
 Caraimanul Bușteni
 Constructorul Galați
 Celuloza Călărași
 Flacăra Moreni
 Minerul Motru
 Mureșul Deva
 Arieșul Turda
 Victoria Carei
 Gaz Metan Mediaș
 Tractorul Brașov
 Victoria Roman
 Petrolul Moinești
 Metalul Mija
 Oțelul Galați
 Autobuzul București
 Oltul Slatina
 Vulturii Textila Lugoj
 UM Timișoara
 IS Câmpia Turzii
 Minerul Cavnic
 Textila Odorheiu Secuiesc
 Carpați Brașov

Relegated from Divizia A
 —

From Divizia B
Relegated to Divizia C
 —

Promoted to Divizia A
 Politehnica Iași
 Politehnica Timișoara

Renamed teams 
Delta Tulcea was renamed as SC Tulcea.

Oltul Slatina was renamed as Dinamo Slatina.

Other teams 
CSM Sibiu and Șoimii Sibiu merged, the first one being absorbed by the second one.

CFR Arad and Vagonul Arad merged, the new entity was named Unirea Arad.

League tables

Serie I

Serie II

Serie III

See also 
 1973–74 Divizia A
 1973–74 Divizia C

References

Liga II seasons
Romania
2